The relationship between race and crime in the United Kingdom is the subject of academic studies, government surveys, media coverage, and public concern. Under the Criminal Justice Act 1991, section 95, the government collects annual statistics based on race and crime.

These statistics have highlighted differences in rates of crime between racial groups, and some commentators have suggested cultural explanations for these differences.

History 
Different ethnic groups are often associated with different types of crime.

Human trafficking 

According to a 2006 report by the Joint Committee on Human Rights, evidence suggested that human traffickers tend to be "split between people from the Far East, the Chinese gangs, and eastern European gangs". In 2020, the National Crime Agency cited criminal, labour and sexual as the most common forms of exploitation in the UK. The NCA named British, Romanian, Chinese, Vietnamese and Albanians as the most prolific offenders. Albanians are estimated to control more than 75% of all Britain’s brothels. The importation and sale of cocaine is now largely dominated by Albanian Organised Crime Groups. Albanians have overtaken Poles as the largest group of foreign prisoners in UK jails.

Polish gangs were the perpetrators of the UK’s largest ever modern slavery ring, which exploited hundreds of vulnerable victims. Poles make up the second largest group of foreign born prisoners in the UK.

Racist and hate crime 

According to a Welsh Government study, the majority of hate crime offenders in the UK are young white males. The Equality and Human Rights Commission state that their research suggests that perpetrators tend to be unemployed young white males with previous convictions.

Sexual grooming 

Since 2011, there has been widespread debate in the UK around so-called ‘grooming’ – depicted as a new crime threat associated with ‘South Asian sex gangs’ who seek out white British girls for sexual abuse. In particular, men of Pakistani heritage were linked to on-street grooming activities (white men were linked to online cases).

Between the mid-1990s and the late-2000s, there was a series of child sexual on-street grooming cases in northern English towns. These cases prompted investigations to look into the claim that "the majority of the perpetrators have been British Pakistani". The first investigation was by Quilliam in December 2017, which released a report entitled "Group Based Child Sexual Exploitation – Dissecting Grooming Gangs". This report claimed 84% of offenders were of South Asian heritage. The British government carried out an investigation in December 2020 titled "Group-based Child Sexual Exploitation". This report concluded that "links between ethnicity and this form of offending" cannot be proven. The report also added "Based on the existing evidence, and our understanding of the flaws in the existing data, it seems most likely that the ethnicity of group-based CSE offenders is in line with CSA (child sexual abuse) more generally and with the general population, with the majority of offenders being White".

Street crime 

Robbery and gang violence have been associated with black people since the 1960s.  The Metropolitan Police has been accused of institutional racism on a number of occasions. One example often cited is the Mangrove Nine, a group eventually acquitted in 1970. Amid growing concerns police are disproportionately targeting black Londoners, Metropolitan Police Commissioner, Cressida Dick, acknowledged the force “is not free of discrimination, racism or bias". Deputy Assistant Commissioner, Bas Javid, admitted the Metropolitan Police has a problem with racism.

In 1995, the London Metropolitan Police commissioner Paul Condon said that the majority of robberies in London were committed by black people. Operation Trident was set up in March 1998 by the Metropolitan Police to investigate gun crime in London's black community after black-on-black shootings in Lambeth and Brent. In 2003, Lee Jasper, Senior Policy Advisor on Equalities to the London mayor, said drugs and gun crime were the "biggest threat to the black community since its arrival here".

In 2007, prime minister Tony Blair commented: "The black community, the vast majority of whom in these communities are decent, law-abiding people are horrified at what is happening – need to be mobilised in denunciation of this gang culture that is killing innocent young black kids. But we won't stop this by pretending it isn't young black kids doing it." A similar sentiment has been shared in the Supreme Court, where Lady Hale stated "It must be borne in mind that many of these gangs are largely composed of young people from black and minority ethnic groups". Lady Hale went further as to use this as justification for "disproportionate" effects, in this case stop and search powers, had on minority groups, saying "put bluntly, it is mostly young black lives that will be saved if there is less gang violence in London and some other cities". Some from the black community criticised his remarks. Gang involvement in general is said to be a "continuing problem". Afro-Caribbean people are overrepresented in violent crimes. Janet Daley has argued in The Daily Telegraph that the issue of black people and crime is downplayed, due to fear of accusations of racism.

The London Metropolitan Police Service has collected statistics on gang rape. Filmmaker Sorious Samura studied statistics on 29 gang rapes and found that "a high proportion were committed by black and mixed-race young men".

Terror crimes 

Whites and Asians tend to be associated with this form of crime. A Home office report claimed "the proportion of white people arrested exceeded the proportion of Asian people arrested for the fourth consecutive year. Arrests of persons of white ethnic appearance accounted for 54 per cent of arrests, up 10 percentage points on the previous year. Those of Asian ethnic appearance accounted for 26 per cent of terrorist-related arrests, down 12 percentage points.”

Increased police operations against far-right extremists is given as one explanation for the increase in white terror arrests. Rising numbers reflects the increasing law enforcement targeting and focus on far-right activities.

England and Wales crime statistics

Human trafficking 
According to the National Crime Agency (NCA), human trafficking in the UK is a rapidly growing issue and has increased by more than 80% in 2016–2017. According to UN estimates, approximately 136,000 people were trafficked in the UK up to 2018

The number of potential victims referred to the National Referral Mechanism (NRM) has risen from 2,340 in 2014 to more than 10,000 in 2020. Labour and criminal exploitation is the most prevalent forms of modern slavery identified in the UK. The most common nationality of potential victims in 2020 was UK nationals, accounting for 34% (3,560) of all referrals. The second most referred nationality was Albanian (15%; 1,638), followed by Vietnamese nationals (6%; 653). UK nationals were most often referred for criminal exploitation, whilst both Albanian and Vietnamese nationals were most referred for labour and criminal exploitation. Sexual exploitation was also commonly reported for Albanian nationals.

There were 8,730 modern slavery offences recorded by the police in the year to March 2020 in England and Wales. There has been an increase of 20% in police case referrals to the Crown Prosecution Service (CPS) including cases referred for early investigative advice, which have resulted in charge (from 427 to 476 pre-charge decisions). Whilst the number of completed cases declined during the year, as well as the total number of completed prosecutions due to Crown Courts being closed during the pandemic, the conviction rate of these cases increased from 71.9% in 2019 to 73.8% in 2020.

Racist / hate crime 
In 2005–2006, there were 6,439 recorded racist crimes in Scotland. 1,543 victims were of Pakistani origin while "more than 1000" were classed as "white British."

The British Crime Survey reveals that in 2004, 87,000 people from black or minority ethnic communities said they had been a victim of a racially-motivated crime. They had suffered 49,000 violent attacks, with 4,000 being wounded. At the same time 92,000 whites said they had also fallen victim of a racially motivated crime. The number of violent attacks against whites reached 77,000, while the number of whites who reported being wounded was five times the number of black and minority ethnic victims at 20,000.

For the year ending March 2021, 124,091 hate crimes were recorded by police in England and Wales. This represents a 9 per cent increase compared with the previous year. For the following year of March 2022 there was a 26 percent increase form the previous year. As well as over 155,000 hate crimes reported in England and Wales. 

Increases in hate crime were seen around certain "triggering" events, such the EU Referendum in June 2016,  the 2017 Westminster terror attacks and the widespread Black Lives Matter protests and far-right counter-protests.

At the start of the coronavirus pandemic, hate crimes directed at both South and East Asian communities significantly increased.

The murder of Stephen Lawrence in 1993 is perhaps the UK's most high profile hate crime of modern times.

Sexual grooming 
The vast majority of child sex offenders in England and Wales are white male, with men representing 98% of all defendants in 2015/16, with whites representing 85% of convicted child sex offenders and 86% of the general population in 2011.

The 2017 Quilliam report entitled "Group Based Child Sexual Exploitation – Dissecting Grooming Gangs" claimed 84% of offenders were of South Asian heritage. However the Quilliam report has come under prominent criticism due to its unscientific nature and poor methodology by child sexual exploitation experts Ella Cockbain and Waqas Tufail, in their paper "Failing Victims, Fuelling Hate: Challenging the Harms of the 'Muslim grooming gangs' Narrative" which was published in January 2020.

A subsequent report was set up by then Home Secretary Sajid Javid, specifically to look into the ‘characteristics’ of grooming gangs following a number of high-profile controversies about the proportion of men of South Asian/Pakistani heritage found to be involved with child sexual exploitation. The Home Office report concluded that most child sexual abuse gangs are made up of white men. Nazir Afzal, the lawyer who brought some of the grooming gangs to justice, commented “It confirms that white men remain the most common offenders, which is something rarely mentioned by right-wing commentators. However, it is not shy in reflecting that south Asian and British Pakistani men are disproportionately found in high-profile cases".

Cockbain and Tufail wrote about  the home office report and stated that the study suggests there are no grounds for claiming that Muslim men nor Pakistani-heritage men are more engaged in such crimes and went on to further state the Quilliam reports unreliability has been confirmed.

SDP politician Patrick O'Flynn criticised the report, describing it as an "exercise in obfuscation". Police often failed to record the ethnicity of both suspects and victims, contributing to an inaccurate view of networked child abuse taking place in the reviewed locations. Conservative politician Tom Hunt stated " I welcomed Priti Patel's promise that more work will be done and that going forward, data relating to the ethnic background of all those found guilty of grooming gang crime will be collected. I'm at a loss as to why this wasn't the case in the past and the lack of such data has made it very hard to draw clear conclusions and therefore to robustly tackle this issue". Police failure to record the ethnicity of the offenders often stemmed from “political correctness” and the fear of being labelled racists.

High profile cases (convicted perpetrators were predominately of Asian/Pakistani heritage);

 Rochdale child sex abuse ring: 12 were initially charged with sex trafficking and other offences including: rape, trafficking girls for sex and conspiracy to engage in sexual activity with a child. 9 men were convicted, of whom 8 were of British Pakistani origin and one was an Afghan asylum-seeker
 Telford child sexual exploitation scandal: Overall, 9 men were convicted of various sexual offences against four girls aged 13 to 16.
 Oxford child sex abuse ring: 22 men who were convicted of various sexual offences against underage girls.
 Halifax child sex abuse ring: 27 men were convicted of various sexual offences against underage girls.
 Keighley child sex abuse ring: 12 men were convicted of various sexual offences against underage girls.
 Newcastle sex abuse ring: 18 men were convicted of various sexual offences against underage girls.
 Peterborough sex abuse case: 10 men were convicted of various sexual offences against underage girls.
 Derby child sex abuse ring: 9 men were convicted of grooming and raping girls between 12 and 18 years old.
 Rotherham child sexual exploitation scandal: 20 people now convicted.

In early 2022, the National Crime Agency launched a new appeal for potential victims to come forward as part of Operation Stovewood – the investigation into allegations of child sexual abuse in and around Rotherham between 1997 and 2013. The operation is the single largest law enforcement investigation into non-familial child sexual abuse (CSA) in the UK. More charges are expected to be brought in 2022.

Street crime 
While members of minority ethnic groups are more likely to be arrested, white people have the highest conviction ratio.

In June 2007 the Home Affairs Select Committee published a report on young black people and the criminal justice system of England and Wales. It said that young black people were over-represented at all stages of the criminal justice system. The Commission for Racial Equality and youth charities welcomed the report.

Ministry of Justice figures regarding race and the criminal justice system in 2018 are shown in the table below.

In 2018 Sky News  initiated freedom of information requests to every police force in the country. Statistics published by Sky News showed that black people in the UK as a whole were over-represented in homicide compared to the population. The figures showed that 13% of murder suspects were black compared to 3% of the population of the United Kingdom (as of the 2010s), and in London 48% of murder suspects compared to 13% of the population.

Stop and searches 

Police officers have the power to stop and search individuals under a range of legislation. Statistics have consistently shown that black people are disproportionately more likely to be subject to stop and searches. In 2008/2009 in England and Wales, more black people were stopped and searched under Section 1 of the Police and Criminal Evidence Act per head of population than any other ethnicity, and black people were seven times more likely to be stopped and searched than whites. Between 2019 and 2020, black people are nine times more likely to be stopped and searched compared to a peopleperson.

Black people were the subject of 14.8 percent of all stop and searches, compared to 7.6 percent of arrests and 6.7 percent of cautions. The disproportionate number of stop and searches is partly accounted for by the fact that 54 percent of the black population in England and Wales live in London, where 40.2% of London's population is either Asian, black, mixed or other in ethnicity, leaving nearly 59% of London's population as white, showing how disproportionate the rate of stop and search is in London. It is important to note that stop and searches are more common for all ethnicities in that area. In some police-force areas, there were more stop and searches per hthe ead of population of whites than of black people. From 2004/05 to 2008/09, there was an increase in the number of stop and searches of black people relative to whites. By 2016/2017, it was recorded that a stop and search was 8.4 times as likely to occur for a black person compared to a white person. Similarly, the rate of stop and searches in mixed ethnicity and Asian people was more than twice as likely, when compared with that of a person with a white ethnicity. More recently, between April 2019 and March 2020, the use of stop and search powers under Section 60 Criminal Justice & Public Order Act occurred 11,408 times, which was an increase of 19% from the year prior.

Stop and searches can also be conducted under Section 60 of the Criminal Justice and Public Order Act 1994. These searches are designed to deal with the threat of violence. Comparative analysis by researchers at the London School of Economics and the Open Society Justice Initiative has shown that, in England and Wales in 2008/09, black people were 26 times more likely to be stopped and searched than whites. Asian people were 6.3 times more likely to be stopped and searched than whites. The OSI researchers stated that these figures highlighted that Britain had the widest "race gap" in stop-and-searches that they had uncovered internationally. Ben Bowling, a professor of criminal justice at King's College London, commented on the analysis, stating:
The police are making greater use of a power that was only ever meant to be used in exceptional circumstances and lacks effective safeguards. This leaves room for increased stereotyping which is likely to alienate those communities which are most affected.

There is strong evience that, once stopped and searched, black people are no more likely than whites to be arrested, suggesting that they are disproportionately targeted. Black individuals who are arrested through stop and search are less likely to have further action taken against them (charged or cautioned), it is argued by Phillips and Brown that this would suggest the evidence used to amount to reasonable suspicion for the stop and search was weaker, as the arrest usually leads to nothing more.

Increases in stop and search powers 
As can be seen, stop and search has consistently been shown to be used disproportionately against people of colour, however there have still been major pushes to increase stop and search powers afforded to the police. In 2020 Boris Johnson defended the use of stop and search powers saying “I do believe that stop and search, amongst many other things, can be a very important utensil in fighting knife crime”. This is echoed by the recent weakening of guidelines for section 60 (s60) stop and searches, being both the lowering of the requirement from reasonably believing an incident involving serious violence “will” occur to “may” and allowing inspeauthorizeauthorise s60 instead of Senior officers. Justification for these changes arise mainly due to the increase in knife crime in London, which has reached around 15.6 thousand, which is roughly 5.8 thousand more than in 2015/16. Questions about the effectiveness of stop and search have been raised, especially in regard to controlling knife crime. Research into Operation Blunt 2 (which consisted of an increase in stop and search in select areas of London) conducted by McCandless, Feist, Allan and Morgan found that there was stop and search had very little epolice-recorded recorded crime. This was further backed up by Tiratelli, Quinton and Bradford in 2018 where they found that although there may be some associationan  between increase in stop and search and reduction in crime, the assertion that this is an effective way to control crime is incorrect. Furthermore, the main effect it has is on drug offences, calling into question the reasoning used by Boris Johnson of knife crime control.

Terror crimes 
Of those arrested for terrorist-related offences between 2011/12 and 2020/21, 44% were reported as being of Asian appearance, 33% White, 13% Black, and 10% Other or Not Known. As of 31 March 2021, 98 (46%) of the 215 prisoners in custody for terrorism connected offences defined themselves as Asian or Asian British, 68 (32%) as White and 18 (8%) as Black or Black British. The majority (73%) of prisoners in custody for terrorism-related offences on 31 March 2021 declared themselves as Muslim. 25 prisoners (12%) were of a Christian denomination.

Right-wing extremism 
Home grown far-right extremism has increased significantly in the United Kingdom and has been described as the fastest growing terror threat within the United Kingdom. With 10 out of 29 terrorist attack plots disrupted in the last four years linked to the far-right. Director General of the MI5 Ken McCallum in his annual threat update of 2021 stated that racism is a significant causative factor in far-right extremism and a major cause for concern. There is a large number of teenage suspects some as young as 13 amid fears that a new generation of extremists was forming lured mainly through extremist content online.

Stop and searches Terrorism Act 2000 
Under Section 43

Of those stopped and searched in London under section 43 powers between 2010/11 and 2020/21: 33% self-defined as White; 28% as Asian or Asian British; and 12% Black or Black British.

Of all the people stopped and searched under S43 in 2020/21: 27% self-defined as White; 21% Asian or Asian British; and 12% Black or Black British. 33% did not state their ethnicity

Schedule 7

Of those stopped for Schedule 7 examinations between 2010/11 and 2020/21: 37% self-defined as White, 26% Asian or Asian British, 19% were Chinese or another ethnicity, and 8% were Black or Black British.

In 2020/21, of those stopped: 24% were White, 25% Asian or Asian British, 25% were Chinese or another ethnicity, and 7% Black or Black British.

Race and crime in London

City of London Police 
A stop and search overview from July 2017 to June 2018 found that blacks were two times more likely to be stopped than white people. When stopped, whites were more unwilling to state their ethnicity than other racial groups. The most common reason for a search was suspected drugs possession. Asians were most commonly stopped in relation to drugs (66%), and then blacks (62%). Whites were subjected to a notable lower level of drug searches (50%). However, despite this, whites had the lowest rate of NFA (no further action). For Asians, 60% of individuals were no further actioned and 28% were arrested. For blacks, roughly 61% of individuals were no further actioned and 20% were arrested. For whites, only 53% were no further actioned while the arrest rate was 27%. Overall, blacks had the lowest arrest rate and the highest no further action rate - despite being subjected to twice as many searches as whites. When stopped, whites were the most likely to be found in breach of drug laws, having the lowest corresponding no further action rate.

Metropolitan Police 
A study published by the Home Office in 2003 found that  70 percent of mugging victims on commuter railways around London identified their muggers as black

Figures from the Office for National Statistics showed that in 2007 an estimated 10.6 percent of London's population of 7,556,900 were black. Evidence shows that the black population in London boroughs increases with the level of deprivation, and that the level of crime also increases with deprivation, such that "It is clear that ethnicity, deprivation, victimisation and offending are closely and intricately inter-related".

In June 2010, through a Freedom of Information Act request, The Sunday Telegraph obtained statistics on accusations of crime broken down by race from the Metropolitan Police Service. The figures showed that the majority of males who were accused of violent crimes in 2009–2010 were black. Of the recorded 18,091 such accusations against males, 54 percent accused of street crimes were black; for robbery, 58 percent; and for gun crimes, 67 percent. However, black people tend to have the lowest conviction ratio so arrests from accusations often fail to result in a corresponding conviction. In the same The Sunday Telegraph report, Simon Woolley commented: “Although the charge rates for some criminal acts amongst black men are high, black people are more than twice as likely to have their cases dismissed, suggesting unfairness in the system".

Between April 2005 and January 2006, figures from the Metropolitan Police Service showed that black people accounted for 46 percent of car-crime arrests generated by automatic number plate recognition cameras.

In 2017, The Independent reported on statistics from HM Inspectorate of Constabulary (HMICFRS), for the year 2016-17. The Metropolitan Police and City of London Police were among the 43 police forces considered. The report found that white people more likely to be carrying drugs when stopped and searched - despite being searched up to 8 times less than black people.

In 2019, The Guardian reported on statistics obtained from the Mayor’s Office for Policing and Crime (MOPAC), for the year 2018. The figures revealed that despite whites being subjected to significantly lower levels of stop and search than blacks, crime was more likely to be detected amongst white Londoners, when they were stop and searched. Whites were more likely to be in possession of weapons and drugs, more likely to be arrested after a search and more likely to be found guilty than black Londoners - despite black Londoners being targeted by police more often. The Guardian quoted figures showing for white Londoners, 30.5% of searches resulted in further action, for Asians 27.8%, and for black Londoners 26.7%. Dr Krisztián Pósch, from the London School of Economics commented: "The data shows that police are not just stopping black people more disproportionately, but are less likely to detect crime when they do compared to when they stop white people”.

Media

Human trafficking 
According to UNODC research, sex stories concerning the victimisation of women and girls disproportionately dominate, often to the exclusion of stories related to labour trafficking and the victimisation of men and boys. The UNODC warns against using stylised images of women and girls in bondage as illustrations for stories as these images perpetuate stereotypes and misconceptions, in particular that trafficking always entails the use of force or restraint.

Racist / hate crimes 
Rania Hamad of charity Iriss wrote:Mass media and political influence can be crucial, with the sensationalist reporting of some events leading to ‘spikes’ in hate crime (eg following the EU Referendum and terrorist incidents). The media can actively create and perpetuate stereotypes about groups which influence individual consciousness, as well as the influence of far-right political parties and extremist groups, which have gained a concerning foothold in the UK and internationally.

Sexual grooming 
Sadie Robinson of the Socialist Worker wrote:Sexual abuse and sexist attitudes aren’t the preserve of Asian men. The press described the abusers in Newcastle as an “Asian sex gang,” “Asian sex ring” and “Asian grooming gang”. The usual calls for Asian people to stamp out abuse—with the implication that they are otherwise responsible for it—followed. In April three white brothers, one white woman and an Asian man were jailed for child sex offences including rape. None of the press described the Sheffield abusers as a “Mostly White Rape Gang”. White people were not called upon to root out abuse in their “communities”. Comment pieces explaining why white people are particularly sexist did not follow.

Street crime 
Young men, particularly young black men, are commonly stereotyped as engaging in criminal behaviour. Past research shows that the media misrepresents the picture of crime and that stories involving violent and sexual offences are over-reported beyond the official statistics. For example, the concerns over mugging in the 1970s were focused on young African-Caribbean men, and the inner city riots of the 1980s were blamed on young black people.

In December 2009 Rod Liddle in The Spectator referred to two black rappers, Brandon Jolie and Kingsley Ogundele, who had plotted to kill Jolie's 15-year-old pregnant girlfriend, as "human filth" and said the incident was not an anomaly. Liddle continued:
The overwhelming majority of street crime, knife crime, gun crime, robbery and crimes of sexual violence in London is carried out by young men from the African-Caribbean community. Of course, in return, we have rap music, goat curry and a far more vibrant and diverse understanding of cultures which were once alien to us. For which, many thanks.

Liddle was accused of racism after his comments, to which he replied that his comments were not racism but a discussion of multiculturalism. In March 2010, the Press Complaints Commission upheld a complaint against Liddle, since "the magazine had not been able to demonstrate that the 'overwhelming majority' of crime in all of the stated categories had been carried out by members of the African-Caribbean community". After the publication of the crime figures in June 2010, The Sunday Telegraph claimed that Liddle was "largely right on some of his claims", but "that he was probably wrong on his claims about knife crimes and violent sex crimes".

Explanations

Human trafficking 
According to various official sources, traffickers are often of Eastern European origin. The fall of the Soviet Union and Eastern European communism has been identified as one of the main contributing factors in explaining the recent increase in human trafficking. It provided both human capital and new regional opportunities to fuel the expansion. After this period, trafficking expanded, aided by the rise of organised crime and the decline of borders. Porous borders and close proximity to Western Europe have made it easier and cheaper to transport victims within the region and abroad.

Sexual grooming 
In 2011 Jack Straw, the former home secretary, suggested there was a cultural element to the then new phenomenon of “grooming gangs” and suggested some Pakistani men see white girls as “easy meat”.

Street crime 
Various explanations have been given for the disproportionate representation rates of arrest and imprisonment of black and ethnic minorities. One explanation is racial bias and discrimination in policing and the criminal justice system. Another is the underachievement of black males (particularly of Caribbean descent) at schools, the lack of black male role models, and aspects of black culture often thought of as encouraging criminal behaviour. Another explanation given was poverty, with certain ethnic minorities being more likely to live "in areas of socio-economic deprivation."

The earliest explanations, in the 19th century, offered a racist framing, focusing on the perceived biological and psychological characteristics of offenders, which were particularly influenced by the work of Charles Darwin and other Darwinists.

In 2010, Diane Abbott, the member of parliament for Hackney said, "There is no question but that the continuing achievement gap between black boys and the wider school population has some bearing on the involvement of African-Caribbean boys in gangs."

Richard Garside, director of the Centre for Crime and Justice Studies, critically observed a tendency to focus on race rather than other demographics (e.g. male versus female) for which there is a far greater crime rate difference. He also observed that the police have a history of targeting black men.

Research published by the Home Office—based on the Offending, Crime and Justice Survey of 2003—found that:

White respondents and those of Mixed ethnic origin were more likely to say they had offended, both on an ever and last year basis than other ethnic groups. This pattern held across offence categories and was also apparent for serious and frequent offending. Conversely, those of Asian origin were least likely to say they had offended.

The reports suggests that these differences are partly accounted for by differences in the age profiles of the groups. The Home Office published an updated version of the survey (using 2006 data) showing that once other variables had been accounted for, ethnicity was not a significant predictor of offending, anti-social behaviour, or drug abuse amongst young people. This research suggests that the differences identified in the 2003 study are "attributable to other characteristics of these sample members", rather than ethnicity. The factors controlled for included weak school discipline, parenting, strong parental guidance, socioeconomic class, local drug problems, weak local control, siblings in trouble with the police, household size, gender, and family type. Interestingly, in a survey done by Home Office in 2016/2017, asking people ages 16–59 if they had used drugs in the past year, it transpired that, of those asked, 20% of those of mixed ethnicity reported to have used drugs in the last year, followed by nearly 10% of those of white ethnicity admitting to using any drug in the last year. This is in contrast with the less than 5% of black people who had used any form of drug in the last year. However, it is important to note that some people may have been dishonest about taking drugs, by either saying they had not taken any drugs when they had, or by saying that they had when they in fact had not. Shiner, Carre, Delsol and Eastwood noted black people were stopped and searched for drugs significantly more than whites yet the drug 'find’ rate was lower for blacks than whites. Whites also have the highest drug conviction ratio.

Various sources have argued that it's this general disproportionality in stop and search that is a key driver of disproportionality in the criminal justice system and prisons. An Her Majesty's Inspectorate of Constabulary and Fire & Rescue Services (HMICFRS) report state the negative effects of disproportionate stop and search leads to more black and ethnic minorities being initially drawn into the criminal justice system, skewing the stats, skewing perceptions, disrupting family life, education and work opportunities. Shiner, Carre, Delsol and Eastwood suggest that the disproportionate application of stop and search is largely a function of police policy and decision-making rather than crime and that police policy play a pivotal role in determining which groups are made available for prosecution and pushed deeper into the criminal justice system.

See also 

 IC codes
 Race and crime
 Crime in the United Kingdom
 Race and crime in the United States
 Racial bias in criminal news

Notes

References

Sources 
 Chigwada-Bailey, Ruth (2003). Black Women's Experiences of Criminal Justice: Race, Gender and Class: A Discourse on Disadvantage. Waterside Press. 
 Muncie, John (ed.); Wilson, David (ed.). (2004). Student Handbook of Criminal Justice and Criminology. Routledge. 
 (2005).  . Home Office. Retrieved 26 September 2010.
 Jansson, Krista (2006).  . Home Office. Retrieved 26 September 2010.
 Marsh, Ian; Melville, Gaynor. (2006). Theories of Crime. Routledge. 
 Home Affairs Select Committee (15 June 2007). House of Commons.   (Online version). The Stationery Office. Retrieved 26 September 2010.
 (October 2007).  . The Stationery Office. Retrieved 27 September 2010. Hosted at the Ministry of Justice website.
 (December 2008).  . The Stationery Office. Retrieved 27 September 2010. Hosted at the Ministry of Justice website.
 (June 2010).  . Ministry of Justice. Retrieved 27 September 2010.

External links 
 "Race and the criminal justice system" (2010) – UK Ministry of Justice

Crime in the United Kingdom
Genetics in the United Kingdom
Race and crime